Nurme may refer to:

Places in Estonia 
Nurme, Harju County, village in Saue Parish, Harju County
Nurme, Järva County
Nurme, Järva County, village in Paide City, Järva County
Nurme, Lääne-Viru County
Nurme, Lääne-Viru County, village in Rakvere Parish, Lääne-Viru County
Nurme, Lääneranna Parish, village in Lääneranna Parish, Pärnu County
Nurme, Muhu Parish, village in Muhu Parish, Saare County
Nurme, Rapla County, village in Märjamaa Parish, Rapla County
Nurme, Saaremaa Parish, village in Saaremaa Parish, Saare County
Nurme, Tori Parish, village in Tori Parish, Pärnu County
Nurme Lake, lake in Nurme village, Saue Parish, Harju County
Valjala-Nurme (formerly Nurme), village in Saaremaa Parish, Saare County

People 
Minni Nurme (1917–1994), Estonian writer
Simon Nurme (born 1982), Swedish football player
Tiidrek Nurme (born 1985), Estonian middle distance runner

See also
Nurmes

Estonian-language surnames